The Tired Business Man is a 1927 American silent comedy film directed by Allen Dale and starring Raymond Hitchcock, Dot Farley and Margaret Quimby. It was produced and released by the independent studio Tiffany Pictures. The film's sets were designed by the art director George Sawley.

Synopsis
The owners of a paving company are financially struggling and are set out to win a new contract from Alderman McGinnis with the assistance of their stenographer Rita.

Cast
 Raymond Hitchcock as 	Alderman McGinnis
 Dot Farley as 	Mrs. McGinnis
 Mack Swain as 	Mike Murphy
 Margaret Quimby as 	Rita
 Charles Delaney as Larry Riley
 Lincoln Plumer as 	Pat Riley
 Blanche Mehaffey as 	Violet Clark
 Gibson Gowland as 	Ole Swanson
 Jim Farley as Sergeant

References

Bibliography
 Connelly, Robert B. The Silents: Silent Feature Films, 1910-36, Volume 40, Issue 2. December Press, 1998.
 Munden, Kenneth White. The American Film Institute Catalog of Motion Pictures Produced in the United States, Part 1. University of California Press, 1997.

External links
 

1927 films
1927 comedy films
1920s English-language films
American silent feature films
Silent American comedy films
American black-and-white films
Tiffany Pictures films
1920s American films